Haddon Heights is a borough in Camden County, in the U.S. state of New Jersey. As of the 2020 United States census, the borough's population was 7,495, an increase of 22 (+.3%) from the 2010 census count of 7,473, which in turn reflected a decline of 74 (−1.0%) from the 7,547 counted in the 2000 Census.

Haddon Heights was incorporated as a borough by an act of the New Jersey Legislature on March 2, 1904, from portions of the now-defunct Centre Township and parts of Haddon Township. Haddon Heights is a dry town where alcohol cannot be sold. The borough was named for Elizabeth Haddon, an early settler of the area.

New Jersey Monthly magazine ranked Haddon Heights as the 98th best place to live in New Jersey in its 2008 rankings of the "Best Places To Live" in New Jersey, and the borough has also been listed among its "Classic Towns of Greater Philadelphia" by the Delaware Valley Regional Planning Commission. In 2011, New Jersey Monthly named Haddon Heights the second best town to live in Southern New Jersey, after Moorestown Township.

History

The land that was to become Haddon Heights was settled in 1699 by John Hinchman. In 1713, John Siddon built a farmhouse near Hinchman's property. John Thorn Glover dammed King's Run and constructed a mill race and fulling mill on this property before 1776. Jacob Hinchman built a frame dwelling no later than 1720 that was later enlarged by American Revolutionary War hero Col. Joseph Ellis. It is currently referred to as the Col. Joseph Ellis House. New Jersey governor Joseph Bloomfield later purchased this property.

In 1890, Benjamin A. Lippincott constructed a passenger station in the center of his land for the Atlantic City Railroad. Then Lippincott, with Charles Hillman, filed a grid street plan with Camden County to develop a community. They named it Haddon Heights because of its proximity to Haddonfield and its high elevation. Large houses were constructed that appealed to prosperous middle-class families moving from the cities. In 1904, Haddon Heights was incorporated as a borough and Lippincott was elected mayor. A small downtown grew near the railroad and the White Horse Pike and eight churches and a synagogue were built. An area of old Centre Township, known as Fairfield Estates, voted in 1926 to become part of Haddon Heights. This land was developed for more single-family housing through the 1940s and 1950s. Even though rail passenger service was suspended in July 1965, Haddon Heights remains a typical turn-of-the-twentieth-century railroad suburb with tree-shaded streets and comfortable homes.

Geography
According to the United States Census Bureau, the borough had a total area of 1.57 square miles (4.07 km2), including 1.57 square miles (4.06 km2) of land and 0.01 square miles (0.01 km2) of water (0.32%).

The borough borders Audubon, Barrington, Bellmawr, Haddonfield, Haddon Township and Mount Ephraim.

Demographics

2020 Census

As of the 2020 United States census there were 7,495 people.

2010 census

The Census Bureau's 2006–2010 American Community Survey showed that (in 2010 inflation-adjusted dollars) median household income was $82,663 (with a margin of error of +/− $9,335) and the median family income was $101,943 (+/− $5,362). Males had a median income of $75,785 (+/− $5,098) versus $58,912 (+/− $4,731) for females. The per capita income for the borough was $40,913 (+/− $3,618). No families and 1.0% of the population were below the poverty line, including none of those under age 18 and 3.3% of those age 65 or over.

2000 census
As of the 2000 United States census there were 7,547 people, 3,039 households, and 2,039 families residing in the borough. The racial makeup of the borough was 97.97% White, 0.40% African American, 0.11% Native American, 0.65% Asian, 0.04% Pacific Islander, 0.27% from other races, and 0.57% from two or more races. Hispanic or Latino of any race were 1.05% of the population.

There were 3,039 households, out of which 30.6% had children under the age of 18 living with them, 56.4% were married couples living together, 8.2% had a female householder with no husband present, and 32.9% were non-families. 28.5% of all households were made up of individuals, and 14.7% had someone living alone who was 65 years of age or older. The average household size was 2.48 and the average family size was 3.09.

In the borough the population was spread out, with 24.1% under the age of 18, 5.3% from 18 to 24, 28.2% from 25 to 44, 24.2% from 45 to 64, and 18.2% who were 65 years of age or older. The median age was 41 years. For every 100 females, there were 89.0 males. For every 100 females age 18 and over, there were 86.3 males.

The median income for a household in the borough was $58,424, and the median income for a family was $73,460. Males had a median income of $51,572 versus $35,208 for females. The per capita income for the borough was $28,198. About 1.0% of families and 2.8% of the population were below the poverty line, including 1.9% of those under age 18 and 5.3% of those age 65 or over.

Arts and culture
The Haddon Heights Public Library provides residents access to more than 46,000 volumes in the fiction, mystery, teen, children's, non-fiction and biography collections as well as periodicals, DVDs, Audio CDs, reference materials, online databases, e-content, and museum passes. Dating back to 1902, there was a Haddon Heights Library Association. The current library building was constructed in 1965.

Government

Local government
Haddon Heights is governed under the Borough form of New Jersey municipal government, which is used in 218 municipalities (of the 564) statewide, making it the most common form of government in New Jersey. The governing body is comprised of a Mayor and a Borough Council, with all positions elected at-large on a partisan basis as part of the November general election. A Mayor is elected directly by the voters to a four-year term of office. The Borough Council has six members elected to serve three-year terms on a staggered basis, with two seats coming up for election each year in a three-year cycle. The borough form of government used by Haddon Heights is a "weak mayor / strong council" government in which council members act as the legislative body, with the mayor presiding at meetings and voting only in the event of a tie. The mayor can veto ordinances subject to an override by a two-thirds majority vote of the council. The mayor makes committee and liaison assignments for council members, and most appointments are made by the mayor with the advice and consent of the council.

The reorganization meeting of the governing body is held on the first Saturday in January. At this meeting, the newly elected council members take the oath of office and a council president, who serves as acting mayor when the mayor is absent, is elected by the council. Appointments for the coming year are announced by the mayor and confirmed by the council when required by law.

, the mayor of Haddon Heights is Democrat Zachary Houck, whose term of office ends December 31, 2023. Members of the Borough Council are Council President Christopher Morgan (D, 2024), Trisha D. Egbert (D, 2023), Regina M. Philipps (D, 2023), Kate Russo (D, 2024), Tom Ottoson (D, 2022) and Scott B. Schreiber (D, 2022; appointed to serve an unexpired term).

At the January 2022 reorganization meeting Scott Schreiber was appointed to fill the seat expiring in December 2022 that had been vacated by Asiyah Kurtz.

In March 2016, the Borough Council selected Vincent Ceroli from three candidates nominated by the Republican municipal committee to fill the seat expiring in December 2016 that had been held by Earl R. Miller Jr. until he resigned from office.

Federal, state and county representation
Haddon Heights is located in the 1st Congressional District and is part of New Jersey's 5th state legislative district.

Politics
As of March 2011, there were a total of 5,754 registered voters in Haddon Heights, of which 2,137 (37.1%) were registered as Democrats, 1,310 (22.8%) were registered as Republicans and 2,300 (40.0%) were registered as Unaffiliated. There were 7 voters registered as Libertarians or Greens.

In the 2012 presidential election, Democrat Barack Obama received 54.8% of the vote (2,352 cast), ahead of Republican Mitt Romney with 44.0% (1,891 votes), and other candidates with 1.2% (51 votes), among the 4,326 ballots cast by the borough's 6,019 registered voters (32 ballots were spoiled), for a turnout of 71.9%. In the 2008 presidential election, Democrat Barack Obama received 55.8% of the vote (2,548 cast), ahead of Republican John McCain, who received around 41.4% (1,893 votes), with 4,568 ballots cast among the borough's 5,586 registered voters, for a turnout of 81.8%. In the 2004 presidential election, Democrat John Kerry received 53.2% of the vote (2,411 ballots cast), outpolling Republican George W. Bush, who received around 45.1% (2,045 votes), with 4,534 ballots cast among the borough's 5,562 registered voters, for a turnout percentage of 81.5.

In the 2013 gubernatorial election, Republican Chris Christie received 65.2% of the vote (1,821 cast), ahead of Democrat Barbara Buono with 33.2% (928 votes), and other candidates with 1.5% (43 votes), among the 2,859 ballots cast by the borough's 6,010 registered voters (67 ballots were spoiled), for a turnout of 47.6%. In the 2009 gubernatorial election, Republican Chris Christie received 47.4% of the vote (1,450 ballots cast), ahead of both Democrat Jon Corzine with 43.7% (1,338 votes) and Independent Chris Daggett with 6.4% (195 votes), with 3,059 ballots cast among the borough's 5,680 registered voters, yielding a 53.9% turnout.

Education
The Haddon Heights School District serves public school students in kindergarten through twelfth grade. As of the 2020–21 school year, the district, comprised of four schools, had an enrollment of 1,519 students and 132.3 classroom teachers (on an FTE basis), for a student–teacher ratio of 11.5:1. Schools in the district (with 2020–21 enrollment data from the National Center for Education Statistics) are 
Atlantic Avenue Elementary School with 127 students in grades Pre-K–6, 
Glenview Elementary School with 262 students in grades K–6, 
Seventh Avenue Elementary School with 128 students in grades K–6 and 
Haddon Heights Junior/Senior High School with 997 students in grades 7–12. The districts' high school also serves students from the neighboring communities of Barrington and Lawnside who attend the high school as part of sending/receiving relationships.

St. Rose of Lima School, founded in 1921, is a K–8 elementary school that operates under the auspices of the Roman Catholic Diocese of Camden.

Baptist Regional School is a private, co-educational K–12 college-preparatory school governed by a board of directors in association with Haddon Heights Baptist Church (GARBC). The school offers an integrated curriculum with a conservative Christian worldview.

Transportation

Roads and highways

Interstate 295 follows the southern border of the borough, while Route 168 (Black Horse Pike) straddles the western border and Route 41 follows the eastern border.

Public transportation
NJ Transit local bus service between the borough and Philadelphia is provided on the 400 and 403 routes, with local service available on the 455 and 457 routes.

Commuter train service to Philadelphia is available using the PATCO Speedline. The closest stops are Westmont and Haddonfield.

Notable people

People who were born in, residents of, or otherwise closely associated with Haddon Heights include:

 Rob Andrews (born 1957), Congressman
 Tommy Avallone (born ), film director and producer
 Andrew Bailey (born 1984), Major League Baseball player, two time MLB All-Star, and 2009 AL Rookie of the Year for the Oakland Athletics
 Edward Clyde Benfold (1931–1952), United States Navy Hospital Corpsman Third Class who was killed in action and posthumously awarded the Medal of Honor
 Matt Brady (born 1965), Division I college basketball head coach at James Madison University
 DyAnne DiSalvo, illustrator
 Erin Donohue (born 1983), middle-distance runner who competed at the 2008 Summer Olympics 
 Bessie Mecklem Hackenberger (1876–1942), one of the earliest American-born saxophone soloists and an active participant and trustee in the Haddon Heights Woman's Club
 Patrick T. Harker (born 1958), President of the Philadelphia Federal Reserve, former President of the University of Delaware
 Steve Israel (born 1969), former NFL cornerback who played for the Los Angeles Rams, San Francisco 49ers, New England Patriots, New Orleans Saints and the Carolina Panthers
 Jeff Jones (born 1957), baseball player who played in MLB for the Cincinnati Reds
 Herb Kelleher (1931–2019), founder/Chairman and former CEO of Southwest Airlines
 Billy Lange (born 1972), head men's basketball coach at the United States Naval Academy started his coaching career at Bishop Eustace Preparatory School in 1995–1996
 Willie Mosconi (1913–1993), billiards world champion
 Blaine Neal (born 1978), Major League Baseball player and Olympic bronze medalist 2008
 Kevin F. O'Toole (born 1950), casino gaming regulator
 George A. Palmer (1895–1981), Protestant clergyman who was pastor at Haddon Heights Baptist Church and started the long-running Morning Cheer radio broadcast in 1932 from his home in Haddon Heights
 Haason Reddick (born 1994), American football linebacker who has played in the NFL for the Arizona Cardinals
 Lee Solomon (born 1954), Associate Justice of the Supreme Court of New Jersey
 Steven Spielberg (born 1946), film director and producer
 Eric Stokes (1930–1999), composer at the University of Minnesota

References

External links

 

 
1904 establishments in New Jersey
Borough form of New Jersey government
Boroughs in Camden County, New Jersey
Populated places established in 1699